Clavosurcula schepmani is a species of sea snail, a marine gastropod mollusk in the family Cochlespiridae.

The specific name schepmani is in honor of Dutch malacologist Mattheus Marinus Schepman.

Description
The length of the shell attains 25.5 mm, its diameter 12.2 mm.

Distribution
This marine species occurs off Eastern Indonesia.

References

 Sysoev, A., 1997. Mollusca Gastropoda: New deep-water turrid gastropods (Conoidea) from eastern Indonesia. Mémoires du Muséum national d'Histoire naturelle 172: 325–355
 1997: New deep-water turrid gastropods (Conoidea) from eastern Indonesia; Résultats des campagnes Musorstorm vol. 16

External links
 BioLib: Clavosurcula schepmani 
 Holotype at the MNHN, Paris

schepmani
Gastropods described in 1997